Birdseye Creek is a stream in the U.S. state of Oregon. It is a tributary to the Rogue River.

Birdseye Creek was named in 1855 for one David Birdseye.

References

Rivers of Oregon
Rivers of Jackson County, Oregon